Nagarajan may refer to

Anisha Nagarajan, American Actress
A. P. Nagarajan, Tamil  film director
Subrahmaniam Nagarajan, Indian wheat  pathologist
Niranjana Nagarajan, Indian Cricketer
Kuppuswamy Nagarajan, Indian organic chemist
K. P. Nagarajan, Tamil Nadu Politician